Tyrone Granderson Jones (born January 19, 1964) is a Creole American actor, screenwriter and producer. He has an MFA from the graduate acting program at the University of California, San Diego.

Filmography

Film

Television

References

External links
 
 The Official Site of Ty Granderson Jones
 Creole Celina Entertainment

1964 births
Living people
20th-century American male actors
21st-century American male actors
American male film actors
American male television actors
American people of Creole descent
Male actors from Florida